Qaleh-ye Qobad (also Romanized as Qal‘eh-ye Qobād; also known as Ghal’eh Ghobad) is a village in Gamasiyab Rural District, in the Central District of Nahavand County, Hamadan Province, Iran. At the 2006 census, its population was 1,026, in 288 families.

References 

Populated places in Nahavand County